Kaarlo Mäkinen (14 May 1892 – 11 May 1980) was a Finnish wrestler who competed at the 1920, 1924 and 1928 Olympics in freestyle wrestling. In 1920 he was eliminated in the preliminary round in the featherweight event. After that he moved to the bantamweight category and won a silver and a gold medal in 1924 and 1928, respectively. He also won two medals in Greco-Roman wrestling at the world championships of 1921 and 1922, as well as four national titles: three in Greco-Roman (1921–1923) and one in freestyle wrestling (1928).

References

External links
 

1892 births
1980 deaths
Olympic wrestlers of Finland
Wrestlers at the 1920 Summer Olympics
Wrestlers at the 1924 Summer Olympics
Wrestlers at the 1928 Summer Olympics
Finnish male sport wrestlers
Olympic gold medalists for Finland
Olympic silver medalists for Finland
Olympic medalists in wrestling
Medalists at the 1924 Summer Olympics
Medalists at the 1928 Summer Olympics
World Wrestling Championships medalists
People from Mariehamn
Sportspeople from Åland
19th-century Finnish people
20th-century Finnish people